This article lists the winners and nominees for the NAACP Image Award for Outstanding Writing in a Drama Series. The award was first given during the 2007 ceremony and since its conception, Shonda Rhimes holds the record for the most wins with five and is currently the only writer to win in this category more than once.

Winners and nominees
Winners are listed first and highlighted in bold.

2000s

2010s

2020s

Multiple wins and nominations

Wins
 5 wins
 Shonda Rhimes

Nominations

 8 nominations
 Janine Sherman Barrois

 7 nominations
 Shonda Rhimes

 4 nominations
 Zoanne Clack

 3 nominations
 Ava DuVernay
 Sara Hess
 Kathleen McGhee-Anderson
 Aaron Rahsaan Thomas
 Anthony Sparks

 2 nominations
 Mara Brock Akil
 Nkechi Okoro Carroll
 Patrick Joseph Charles
 Erika Green Swafford
 Cheo Hodari Coker
 LaToya Morgan
 Pam Veasey
 Lena Waithe
 Alexander Woo

References

NAACP Image Awards